James MacEwan was Dean of Ardfert  from 1906 until his death on 10 January 1911.

MacEwan was educated at Trinity College, Dublin and  ordained in 1858. He began his ecclesiastical career with a curacy at Ballymachugh. He was Curate then Vicar of Listowel until 1882 then Rector of Dromtariffe from then until 1908.

References

Alumni of Trinity College Dublin
Deans of Ardfert
1911 deaths
Year of birth missing